Mindon Township is a township of Thayet District in the Magway Region of Burma (Myanmar).  Its administrative seat is Mindon.

Notes

External links
 Township 102 on "Myanmar States/Divisions & Townships Overview Map" Myanmar Information Management Unit (MIMU)
 "Mindon Google Satellite Map" Maplandia

 
Townships of Magway Region